The Aspen Business Luncheon is a 42-year-old tradition held in Aspen, Colorado.

The aim of the Luncheon is to provide weekly meetings between the local community and distinguished speakers, including former Secretary of State Madeleine Albright, New York Times author Thomas Friedman and Colorado governor John Hickenlooper.

History
Previously named Aspen's "Friday Men's Lunch," the lunch was opened up to women by Todd Shaver in his reorganization of the tradition in 2010 after 35 years.

The gathering usually occurs every Wednesday.

Notable attendees
 Tom Friedman, columnist, New York Times
 Tony Malkin, owner of the Empire State Building
 Dr. Naresh Mandava, eye surgeon at Anschutz Medical Campus in Denver
 Tom Korologos – former Ambassador to Belgium
 Fred Malek – former head of Marriott Hotels and Northwest Airlines
 Jerry Greenwald – former CEO and chairman of the Board of United Airlines
 Harvey Mackay – author of Swim with the Sharks Before Getting Eaten Alive
 Walter Isaacson - author of Steve Jobs and CEO of The Aspen Institute
 Goldie Hawn 
 David Bonderman, CEO of TPG, a private equity firm.

References

Events in Colorado
Aspen, Colorado